Return to Life marks the sixth album from War of Ages. Facedown Records released the project on April 24, 2012.

Reception

Specifying in a four star review by HM Magazine, Taylor Rhea Smith recognizes, "With a noticeably richer, more melodic/ less hardcore sound, these are songs you’ll want to listen to over and over" Graeme Crawford, indicating in an eight out of ten review from Cross Rhythms, replying, "'Return To Life' may not be their best work, but it is also not a step backwards and is an uplifting album." Signaling in a three star review from Jesus Freak Hideout, Michael Weaver responds, "War of Ages' fifth studio album isn't bad; it's just typical metalcore with very, very little variation." Lee Brown, writes in a three star review from Indie Vision Music, realizing, "Return to Life doesn't break much new ground musically for fan-favorite War of Ages."

Tracks

Personnel
War of Ages
 Leroy Hamp – vocals
 Steve Brown – guitar
 Mark Randazzo – guitar, clean vocals
 Ryan Tidwell - bass
 Alex Hamp – drums, percussion

Charts

References

2012 albums
War of Ages albums
Facedown Records albums
Albums produced by Chris "Zeuss" Harris